Los Baños, officially the Municipality of Los Baños, colloquialy 'elbi' or simply LB, is a 1st class municipality in the province of Laguna, Philippines. According to the 2020 census, it has a population of 115,353 people.

It has a total land area of 56.5 square kilometers and is bordered on the south and south-west by Mount Makiling, on the north by Laguna de Bay., on the north-west by Calamba and on the east by the town of Bay.

The municipality lies on the northern slopes of the long dormant volcano Mount Makiling and is known among tourists for its hot spring resorts. Los Baños also hosts two constituent universities of the University of the Philippines System: the University of the Philippines Los Baños and University of the Philippines Open University, along with other foreign and local and international research centers, such as the International Rice Research Institute, the ASEAN Center for Biodiversity, the Philippine Rice Research Institute, Philippine Carabao Center at UPLB, and SEAMEO-SEARCA, making the town a temporary home for tens of thousands of both local and foreign undergraduate and graduate students, researchers and support staff.

Los Baños was declared as the Special Science and Nature City of the Philippines through Presidential Proclamation No. 349. The proclamation, however, does not convert the municipality to a city or give it corporate powers that are accorded to other cities.

Aside from its importance in academics, science and research, Los Baños is a well-known tourist destination. Because of the town's proximity to Metro Manila, Los Baños' hot spring resorts are frequent weekend or summer getaways for residents of the vast metropolis and tourists from other places in the Philippines and abroad. Tourists who visit Los Baños also come to the several native delicacies stores in the town to buy the town's famous buko pie (coconut meat pie) as well as a home-grown brand of chocolate cake. Currently, it is Laguna's richest municipality in terms of assets amounting to Php 652.95 M.

History

Precolonial and Spanish colonial period
Los Baños started as a settlement, a barrio of Bay, called Mainit, the Tagalog term for "hot", alluding to the thermal springs at the foot of Mount Makiling. By 1589, through a Franciscan friar, it became popularly called by its present name, "Los Baños", which is Spanish for "bathing place".

In 1595, a temporary building made of bamboo and cogon was built to serve as shelter for the patients who journeyed to Mainit to seek cures for their ailments. It was on 17 September 1615 when the friars administered Los Baños as a separate town from Bay.

In 1671, more permanent structures like churches and hospitals were built only to be destroyed by a fire in 1727. The structures were re-erected at a slow rate. The church which now stands in the municipal center of Los Baños dates back to 1851. The Spanish Governor's palace was built in 1879 but was only completed in 1892.

American colonial period (1900–1946)

In 1909, the University of the Philippines College of Agriculture (UPCA) was established.

The UPCA became a Japanese prisoner of war camp for nationals of the Allied countries, a target of Kempetai punitive measures, and the headquarters of a secret organization of guerrillas. On 23 February 1945, US forces of the First Battalion, 511th Parachute Infantry Regiment of the Eleventh Airborne Division led a combined amphibious and airborne raid against the prison camp, rescuing over 2,000 Allied nationals. They killed the 250-man Japanese garrison.  In order to force the prisoners to leave behind their belongings and speed up the evacuation before the Japanese could send reinforcements, US forces and Filipino guerrillas burned the camp. Only Baker Hall, the university gymnasium until 2010, remained intact.

Postwar era (1946-1965)
In 1959, the 10th World Scout Jamboree was held in Los Baños, with the theme "Building Tomorrow Today" with an attendance of 12,203 Scouts.

The International Rice Research Institute (IRRI) was established in 1960 during the administration of President Carlos P. Garcia, and soon after President Diosdado Macapagal had started his term, IRRI had begun work on the development of the new “Miracle Rice” (IR8) variety, which would later increase Philippine rice production significantly.

Marcos martial law era (1965-1986) 
The social unrest which arose when Ferdinand Marcos' debt-driven campaign spending led to the 1969 Philippine balance of payments crisis  spread beyond the capital and also triggered protests by students in UP Los Baños, most prominently in the form of a 13-day strike which saw barricades established at the UPLB Gate and Los Baños Highway Junction areas. This unrest coincided with another issue, which was the call for the UP College of Agriculture to become independent from the University of the Philippines in Diliman.

When martial law was declared in September 1972, Marcos cracked down on any form of criticism or activism, leading to the arrest of many of Los Baños residents.  Among those who experienced arrest and torture during martial law were the UPLB Institute of Chemistry's Dr. Aloysious Baes, while among those who became desaparecidos were Tish Ladlad, Cristina Catalla, Gerardo "Gerry" Faustino, Rizalina Ilagan, and UPLB Professor Jessica Sales. Among those confirmed to have been martyred for their beliefs was Manuel Bautista, the student leader who had spearheaded the establishment of UPLB's Textbook Exchange and Rental Center (TERC).

In 1979, the evolution and development of academic excellence in Los Baños moved the people of Los Baños to request president Marcos to declare the municipality as "A Special University Zone", granted on 15 June 1982 by virtue of letter of instruction No. 883.

Los Baños was further declared as an "Agriculture, Forestry, and Life Sciences Community" on 17 March 1982 by virtue of Executive Order No. 784 (Section 23).

Post-EDSA revolution era 
On 7 August 2000, Los Baños was declared a Special Science and Nature City of the Philippines by virtue of Presidential Proclamation 349. It was signed by then President Joseph Estrada. The Proclamation is in recognition of the town's important contribution in country. The municipality has remained as the country's hub of science and nature with the presence of national and international research institutions collaborating towards the advancement of science research.

21st Century
The 6th Flora Malesiana, a triennial gathering of people with botanical expertise regarding "Malesia", was held from 20 to 24 September 2004. It provided a forum for Flora Malesiana members and encouraged publications on Malesian plants.

During the 2005 Southeast Asian Games, Los Baños played host to the aquatics events, with the newly built Trace Aquatic Center at Trace College serving as the venue.

The headquarters of the Association of Southeast Asian Nations (ASEAN) Center for Biodiversity was opened on 8 August 2006, having leased office spaces until late 2010s from the DENR-Ecosystems Research and Development Bureau, located at the College of Forestry, University of the Philippines Los Baños. It coincided with the foundation day celebrations of the organization. The Philippines assumed the Chairmanship of ASEAN in 2006 and played host to the 12th ASEAN and East Asia Summits (held in Metro Cebu, January 2007).

In January 2007, the 5th ASEAN Inter-Club Age-Group Swimming Championships was held in the Trace Aqua Sports Center.

Los Baños also plays host to the UAAP, as the Trace Aquatics Center has served as the venue for the league's swimming competitions since UAAP Season 70 until UAAP Season 76.

Currently, Los Baños is probably the densest habitat of academicians in South East Asia. Although it is a small town, it has contributed widely through scientific achievements and contributions locally and worldwide particularly on agriculture.

On 3 December 2020, its incumbent mayor, Caesar P. Perez was assassinated by an armed assailant, with a former councilor-colleague said to be the mastermind.

Geography

Los Baños is nestled between two of Southern Luzon's most dominant geographical features – Mount Makiling to the south and south-west and Laguna de Bay to the north. In fact, Laguna de Bay's southernmost tip is at Barangay Bambang, and Barangay Bagong Silang is already halfway up Mount Makiling. Both the mountain and the lake are volcanic features – Makiling being a potentially active volcano whose geothermal activities gave birth to the hot springs after which the town was named, and Laguna de Bay being the filled-in caldera of a massive prehistoric volcano.

Another notable geological feature is Tadlac Lake, a maar lake whose almost perfectly round shape and uncharted waters have led some locals to call it "the enchanted lake". Others call it "alligator lake", a reminder that it served as the last bastion of Laguna de Bay's once-plentiful cayman population, which has since been wiped out and is now just another legendary part of Philippine history.

Rivers
The town of Los Baños is crossed by five rivers or creeks:
 The Dampalit river, which is named after an edible herb, dampalit (Sesuvium portulacastrum), which often grows near river shores, originates on the north face of Mt. Makiling east of the Philippine High School for the Arts, and feeds into Laguna lake at the boundary of Barangays Lalakay and Bambang.
 The Saran creek, whose headwaters begin somewhere near the municipal dumpsite, flows through Barangay Anos near the municipal cemetery, and feeds into the lake at Barangay Malinta.
 The Pele creek, named after the pili tree (Canarium ovatum), flows through the west side of Barangay Batong Malake and has its mouth at the boundary of Barangays Malinta and Mayondon.
 The Molawin River, most familiar to UPLB students because it flows through the UPLB campus and the Makiling Botanic Gardens, is named after the Molave tree (Vitex parviflora).
 The Maitim river, whose name means "black", flows through the westernmost portions of Los Baños, marking the town's boundary with its neighboring town of Bay. The Molawin and Maitim rivers merge just a few meters before feeding into Laguna de Bay at the shore of Barangay Maahas.

Climate
Los Baños has a tropical monsoon climate (Köppen climate classification Am).

Barangays

Los Baños is politically subdivided into 14 barangays.

Demographics

Economy

Tourism

University of the Philippines Los Baños and other places of interest within its administered area
Mount Makiling
Makiling Botanic Gardens
ASEAN Center for Biodiversity
UPLB Museum of Natural History
Flatrocks – creek usually frequented by hikers
Mudspring – Presumed volcanic crater of Mt. Makiling
Peak 2 – Highest peak of Mt. Makiling
Pook ni Maria Makiling, an eco-tourism site adjacent to the Jamboree Site, National Arts Center, and U.P. Los Baños
Boy Scouts of the Philippines and Jamboree Site – a campsite at the foot of Mount Makiling adjacent to U.P. Los Baños, which is being managed by the Boy Scouts of the Philippines and the site of the 10th World Scout Jamboree in 1959, the 1st and 12th Asia Pacific Jamboree in 1973 and 1991, and the 1st ASEAN Jamboree in 1993.
National Arts Center – a patch of land at the foot of Mount Makiling adjacent to U.P. Los Baños, which is being managed by the Cultural Center of the Philippines and the site of the Philippine High School for the Arts, a special school for young artist scholars.
International Rice Research Institute
Philippine Rice Research Institute
Dairy Training & Research Institute
Philippine Carabao Center at UPLB (PCC at UPLB) – conducts R&D in water buffalo; implements other programs related to water buffalo development; one of the 13 regional centers of PCC (see the link below)
Agricultural and Life Sciences Complex
National Institute of Molecular Biology and Biotechnology (NIMBB/BIOTECH) – UPLB
Institute of Plant Breeding
APEC Center for Technology Exchange and Training for Small and Medium Enterprises (ACTETSME)
National Crop Protection Center (NCPC)
College of Agriculture AgriPark
 Baker Hall (also known as Los Baños Internment Camp during World War II)
University of the Philippines Open University
Philippine Council for Agriculture, Aquatic, and Natural Resources Research and Development (PCAARRD)
Department of Science and Technology Regional Office for Region IV (DOST IV)
Magnetic Hill
Dampalit Falls
Immaculate Conception Parish – a centuries-old church at the town proper (Poblacion/Bayan)
Paciano Rizal Shrine – house of Paciano Rizal, brother of National Hero Jose Rizal
Paciano Rizal Park – park dedicated to Paciano Rizal, brother of National Hero Jose Rizal
Trace Aqua Sports Complex and Museum – aquatic sports venue for the 2005 SEA Games and Philippine Olympic Festival
Yamashita Shrine – execution site of Gen. Homma and Gen. Yamashita

Education
There are 16 daycare schools in Los Baños, managed by DSWD and local government.

University of the Philippines Los Baños
University of the Philippines Open University
Laguna State Polytechnic University (Los Baños Campus)
Christian School International
Maquiling School Incorporated
Trace College
Colegio De Los Baños
Saint Anthony School-LB
Los Baños National High School
Los Baños National High School – Poblacion 
Liceo de Los Baños
University of the Philippines Rural High School
Los Baños Central Elementary School
Lopez Elementary School
Bernaldo N. Calara Elementary School
Liceo de Los Baños
South Hill School Inc.
San Antonio Elementary School
The Learning Place International
Morning Star Montessori School Inc.
Maranatha Elementary School
Hasik Bagong Buhay Christian School
Joy in Learning School
Los Baños Faith Christian School
Lalakay Elementary School
Malinta Elementary School
Mayondon Elementary School
Tuntungin Elementary School
Bayog Elementary School
Tadlac Elementary School
Bagong Silang Elementary School

Sister cities 
 Davis, California, United States

References

External links

 Municipality of Los Baños official
 Los Baños History
 [ Philippine Standard Geographic Code]
 Philippine Census Information
 Local Governance Performance Management System

 
Municipalities of Laguna (province)
Populated places on Laguna de Bay
Spa towns in the Philippines